The Cultural Strategy Group is an official body of City Hall London and the Greater London Authority, whose members are appointed by the Mayor of London to develop strategic policy in the capital city in regard to culture, media, sport, arts, heritage and tourism.

The Cultural Strategy Group has variously been known as The Cultural Strategy Group for London (for the period 2000-4 under London Mayor Ken Livingstone ), London Cultural Consortium (under Mayor Ken Livingstone between 2005-8)and more recently as The London Cultural Strategy Group (since 2008 under London Mayor Boris Johnson ).

The meetings of the inaugural Cultural Strategy Group for London were jointly chaired by Aladin between 2000-4, by Yasmin Anwar between 2000-2 and by Jennette Arnold between 2002-4. Aladin was Co/Vice Chair of the strategy group   itself between 2000-4, Yasmin Anwar was Chair between 2000-2 and Jennette Arnold was Chair 2002-4.

The meetings of the London Cultural Consortium were chaired by Chris Smith, Baron Smith of Finsbury between 2005-8.

The London Cultural Strategy Group has been meeting since 2008 and its current Chair is Iwona Blazwick

The Cultural Strategy Group for London published its strategy in the form of the document London:Cultural Capital in 2003.

The London Cultural Strategy Group published its strategy in the form of the document Cultural Metropolis.

References

External links
 Cultural Strategy Group for London 2000-4
 London Cultural Consortium 2005-8
 London Cultural Strategy Group 2008 - present
 Cultural Strategy Group for London Meetings chaired by Aladin 2000-4
 Cultural Strategy Group for London Meetings chaired by Yasmin Anwar 2000-2
 Cultural Strategy Group for London Meetings chaired by  Jennette Arnold 2002-4
 Meetings of London Cultural Strategy Group and London Cultural Consortium chaired by Iwona Blazwick and Chris Smith
 2003 London: Cultural Capital strategy document of Cultural Strategy Group for London
 2010 Cultural Metropolis strategy document of London Cultural Strategy Group

Greater London Authority